Arduino Berlam (1880–1946) was an Italian architect who took over the work of his father, Ruggero Berlam.

Born in Trieste, from 1905 he actively contributed to his father's works, creating such a harmony that experts now find it difficult to differentiate their work.  Like his father and grandfather, Arduino was educated at the school of engineering and at the Brera Academy, and most active in his native town, designing not only houses and palaces, but also monuments (Victory Lighthouse and Virgil's memorial plaque at the mouths of the river Timavo), as well as the interior decoration of the famous ships Saturnia and Vulcania.

He died at Tricesimo in 1946.

Work 

 Palazzo Berlam designed by Arduino Berlam
 Porec Town Hall
 Hilton Trieste in Piazza della Repubblica
 RAS Palace
 Synagogue of Trieste

References

1880 births
1946 deaths
Architects from Trieste
Brera Academy alumni